The Financial Services Compensation Scheme (FSCS) is the UK's statutory deposit insurance and investors compensation scheme for customers of authorised financial services firms. This means that FSCS can pay compensation if a firm is unable, or likely to be unable, to pay claims against it. The FSCS is an operationally independent body, set up under the Financial Services and Markets Act 2000 (FSMA), and funded by a levy on authorised financial services firms. The scheme rules of the FSCS are made by the Financial Conduct Authority (FCA) and are contained in the FCA's Handbook. The FCA also appoint its Board and the FSCS is ultimately accountable to the FCA. The scheme covers deposits, insurance policies, insurance brokering, investments, mortgages and mortgage arrangement.

FSCS is free to consumers and, since 2001, has helped more than 4.5 million people and paid out more than £26 billion. Since 31 December 2010, maintaining a single customer view has become mandatory for United Kingdom banks and other deposit takers due to new rules introduced by the FSCS.

History 

The FSCS came into existence in 2001 and replaced former multiple schemes. Between 2001 and 2006 the scheme paid out close to 1 billion pounds in compensation. In the period from 2006 to 2011 the financial crisis resulted in compensation of over 26 billion pounds being paid out by the FSCS. In 2008 the FSCS was given a loan by the Bank of England in order to be able to guarantee the deposits of customers of Bradford & Bingley. The compensation limits were last revised in 2010 to bring them into line with the EU (and EEA) deposit guarantee requirements under the European Union directive 94/19/E.

On 31 August 2012 UK authorised banks, building societies and credit unions were required to display information about FSCS protection in branch and online, this included posters and window stickers. This action followed the introduction of new Financial Services Authority (FSA) rules obliging deposit takers to display information about FSCS protection available to consumers. The UK branches of foreign banks from the European Economic Area (EEA) have to specify that their customers are not covered by FSCS and clearly state which national scheme provides protection.

On 14 January 2013 FSCS launched a consumer awareness programme, aiming to reassure consumers and boost confidence, thereby aiding financial stability. It follows on from the disclosure requirements and uses icons of protection to engage with the consumers and highlight the safety FSCS provides to savings and deposits. The advertising programme is scheduled to run in national press, radio, online and digital.

Funding 
The FSCS is funded by levies on firms authorised by the Prudential Regulation Authority and the Financial Conduct Authority. FSCS's costs are made up of management expenses and compensation payments.

Bank, building society or credit union insolvency 
The FSCS protects UK authorised banks, building societies and credit unions up to £85,000 per depositor in the event of their insolvency. If deposits or savings are in a joint account the total of FSCS protection doubles to £170,000.
FSCS protection is free and automatic. If anything happens to your bank, building society or credit union, FSCS will automatically refund your savings. In the vast majority of cases savings are refunded in less than 7 days.

From 3 July 2015 some types of temporary high balances of up to £1,000,000 are protected for up to six months.

Compensation limits

References

Citations

Sources

External links
Financial Services Compensation Scheme
The section of the Financial Services and Markets Act 2000 setting out the scheme
Financial Services Compensation Scheme videos

Financial services companies established in 2001
Financial regulation in the United Kingdom
2001 introductions
Consumer protection in the United Kingdom
Employment compensation
Data laws